Paul Eibeler was CEO of Take-Two Interactive between 2005 and 2007. Prior to this role, he  served as president of the company between July 2000 and June 2003.

Early life
Eibler was born on July 26, 1955 in Hicksville, New York. He attended Holy Trinity High School where he excelled in basketball and this enabled him to earn an athletic scholarship to Loyola College of Maryland. He was awarded the ECAC Merit Medal in his senior year and graduated in 1978 with a Bachelor of Arts degree..

Take-Two Interactive
In July 2000, Eibeler joined Take-Two Interactive as president and director. In April 2003, he left Take-Two after a medical leave, and returned as president and director in April 2004, replacing Ryan Brant who was being investigated for accounting irregularity.  In February 2005, Eibeler replaced Richard Roedel as CEO. In March 2007, Eibeler resigned as CEO after a proxy battle.

Most notable events during Eibler's management:

In July 2005, CEO Eibeler oversaw a Federal Trade Commission investigation into advertising practices and claims.
In July 2005, Eibeler oversaw the rating change of best-selling game Grand Theft Auto: San Andreas from "Mature" to "Adult" and the resulting drop in distribution.
In late 2005, CNBC commentator Herb Greenberg named Eibeler the worst American CEO of that year.

In 2006 Eibeler oversaw investigations into backdating of options for former Take-Two executives which resulted in the company's founder, Ryan Brant pleading guilty and was convicted of a felony.
Throughout his tenure, CEO Eibeler oversaw a groundswell of political pressure against Take-Two from the political right, and from conservative activist Jack Thompson. Penny Arcade came to Eibeler's defense after attacks by Thompson and donated $10,000 to charity. Thompson has since been disbarred.
Take-Two grew from $250 million in revenue to over $1.5 billion, the company's market capitalization increased from $250 million to over $1.5 billion and employee numbers grew from 200 to 2000.
The shareholder base included key funds such as Fidelity, Legg Mason, Seligman, Oppenheimer, etc.
The company developed over 30 million major unit titles including the Grand Theft Auto franchise, Midnight Club, Max Payne, Sid Meier's Civilization, Bioshock, Carnival Games, and maintained premier relationships with the National Football League, the National Basketball Association, the National Hockey League and Major League Baseball through the 2K Sports division.
Take-Two's stock rose 198% from $7.58 per share in July 2000 to $15.01 a share in April 2003. Upon returning in 2004, shares rose 26% from $23.46 in April 2004 to a high of $29.34 in June 2005.

Other roles

On August 3, 2009, SouthPeak Games announced that Eibeler had joined its board of directors.

Personal life
Eibeler has been married to Mary for more than 30 years and has three children. He currently lives in Long Island.

References

1955 births
Living people
Loyola Greyhounds men's basketball players
Take-Two Interactive
Video game businesspeople
People from Hicksville, New York
American technology chief executives
American men's basketball players